Francis Annesley may refer to:

 Francis Annesley (1663–1750), British member of parliament for Preston and Westbury
 Francis Annesley (1734–1812), English member of parliament for Reading
 Francis Annesley, 1st Viscount Valentia (1585–1660), English statesman during the colonisation of Ireland
 Francis Annesley, 1st Earl Annesley (1740–1802), Anglo-Irish politician and peer
 Francis Annesley, 6th Earl Annesley (1884–1914), Anglo-Irish peer, Royal Navy officer and pioneer aviator